Syada is a village and municipality in Humla District in the Karnali Zone of north-western Nepal. At the time of the 1991 Nepal census it had a population of 1307 persons living in 213 individual households.

References

External links
UN map of the municipalities of Dolpa District

Populated places in Humla District